Colonel Charles John Coventry, CB (26 February 1867 – 2 June 1929) was a British Army officer and an amateur cricketer who played in two retrospectively-recognised  Test matches for England in 1899. Those were his only first-class appearances and he was never a member of any first-class county team. He was born in Marylebone, Middlesex, and died in Earl's Croome, Worcestershire.

Biography
Coventry was the second son of George Coventry, 9th Earl of Coventry. He was educated at Eton College. In 1922, he took command of the re-formed Worcestershire and Oxfordshire Yeomanry Brigade, now serving as 100 Field Brigade, Royal Artillery. He retired from the Yeomanry in 1925.

Cricket
Coventry played his cricket for Worcestershire when it was still a minor county, that is, a county without first-class status. He was described as "a fair bat with a free style who can hit hard".

When the English tour to South Africa in 1888–89 was being put together, because the South Africans were considered weak, weaker players were selected for the English team. Coventry was one of those players selected. England still won the two games against representative South African sides easily, though Coventry did not feature prominently in either game: he batted at number 10 and did not bowl. On the whole tour he scored 174 runs at an average of 10.23 with a highest score of 33 not out, and took three wickets. He played no first-class cricket in his career other than in those two Tests.

Family
Coventry married, in St Peter's Church, Eaton Square, on 16 January 1900, Lily Whitehouse, younger daughter of Mr. FitzHugh Whitehouse, of Newport, USA. His younger son Francis briefly succeeded as 12th Earl of Coventry.

References

External links
 

1867 births
1929 deaths
Companions of the Order of the Bath
England Test cricketers
English cricketers
Military personnel from London
People educated at Eton College
People from Marylebone
Worcestershire Yeomanry officers
Worcestershire cricketers
Younger sons of earls

mr:चार्ली कोव्हेन्ट्री